The 2021 Rhineland-Palatinate state election was held on 14 March 2021 to elect the 18th Landtag of Rhineland-Palatinate. The outgoing government was a "traffic light coalition" of the Social Democratic Party (SPD), Free Democratic Party (FDP), and The Greens led by Minister-President Malu Dreyer.

The SPD won an unexpectedly clear plurality of 35.7% of votes cast, less than one percentage point lower than their 2016 result. The opposition Christian Democratic Union (CDU) finished on 27.7%, a decline of four percentage points, its worst result in the state to date. The Greens moved from fifth to third place with 9.3%. Alternative for Germany (AfD) saw the worst losses of any party, falling to 8.3%. The Free Democratic Party recorded a small decline to 5.5% but retained their seats. The Free Voters (FW) entered the Landtag for the first time with 5.4%, marking their third appearance in a state parliament overall, following Bavaria and Brandenburg.

Overall, the incumbent government was returned with an increased majority. After the election, Minister-President Dreyer expressed her desire to renew the outgoing coalition. On 30 April, the SPD, Greens, and FDP came to a coalition agreement. Dreyer was re-elected as Minister-President on 18 May.

Election date
The period of the 17th Landtag began on 18 April 2016. Landtag elections may take place between 57 and 60 months after the commencement of the term of the previous Landtag; thus, the election may take place between February and May 2021. On 11 February 2020, the state government announced the date of the election as 14 March 2021. A state election was held on the same day in neighbouring state of Baden-Württemberg.

Electoral system
The Landtag is elected via mixed-member proportional representation. 52 members are elected in single-member constituencies via first-past-the-post voting. 49 members are then allocated using compensatory proportional representation, distributed in four multi-member districts. Voters have two votes: the "first vote" for candidates in single-member constituencies, and the "second vote" for party lists, which are used to fill the proportional seats. The minimum size of the Landtag is 101 members, but if overhang seats are present, proportional leveling seats will be added to ensure proportionality. An electoral threshold of 5% of valid votes is applied to the Landtag; parties that fall below this threshold are excluded.

Background

In the previous election held on 13 March 2016, the SPD retained its position as the largest party ahead of the Christian Democratic Union (CDU). Alternative for Germany (AfD) contested its first election in Rhineland-Palatinate, placing third with 12.6%. The FDP returned to the Landtag after falling out in 2011, winning 6.2% and 7 seats. The Greens narrowly retained their representation with 5.3%, a loss of 10.1 percentage points.

The SPD had led a coalition with the Greens since 2011 but lost its majority in the election. The SPD subsequently formed a coalition with the FDP and Greens.

Parties
The table below lists the parties represented in the 17th Landtag.

In addition to the parties already represented in the Landtag, eight other parties contested the election:

Campaign

Lead candidates
On 18 October 2019, the state executive of The Greens nominated Anne Spiegel, Minister for Family, Women, Youth, Integration and Consumer Protection, as the party's lead candidate for the election.

On 16 November 2019, leader of the CDU parliamentary group Christian Baldauf was selected as his party's lead candidate for the election. He won 80.25% of votes against challenger Marlon Bröhr, administrator of the Rhein-Hunsrück district.

On 2 December 2019, Minister-President Malu Dreyer announced her withdrawal from the federal executive of the SPD in order to focus on state politics and the upcoming state election. She had served as co-deputy leader of the federal party since 2017, and was joint acting leader from June to December 2019 after the resignation of leader Andrea Nahles. The announcement came after the 2019 leadership election which saw Saskia Esken and Norbert Walter-Borjans chosen as Nahles' successors. Rhineland-Palatinate state party leader Roger Lewentz stated: "[Dreyer] is the best Minister-President for Rhineland-Palatinate. In the coming year we will do everything we can to ensure that she can continue to hold her post even after the state election in 2021." She was formally confirmed as lead candidate on 7 December 2020.

On 19 August 2020, the state FDP executive chose State Secretary for Economic Affairs Daniela Schmitt as their lead candidate for the election.

On 5 September, AfD announced their list of candidates for the election. State leader Michael Frisch was the lead candidate.

Joachim Streit was the lead candidate for the Free Voters.

Opinion polling

Graphical summary

Party polling

Minister-President polling

Preferred coalition

Results

Aftermath
The result was considered a victory for the SPD, contrasting a long string of losses in other state, federal, and local elections since 2018. Their success was attributed to the popularity of incumbent Minister-President Dreyer during the COVID-19 pandemic in Germany. After the election, the SPD's federal Chancellor candidate Olaf Scholz voiced his support for a "traffic light" coalition on the federal level.

The CDU's poorer-than-expected result was attributed in part to local factors, such as Dreyer's popularity and the difficulty faced by the opposition when campaigning during pandemic conditions. Commentators also pointed to federal factors, such as the unpopularity of newly-elected federal CDU chairman Armin Laschet, poor management of the pandemic by federal government, and particularly the "mask scandal" which broke a few days before the election. The result was perceived as harming the CDU/CSU's standing ahead of the September federal election, and damaging Laschet's chances of being selected as the Union's candidate for Chancellor.

Government formation
Minister-President Malu Dreyer quickly voiced her desire to continue the coalition between the SPD, Greens, and Free Democrats. State FDP chairman Volker Wissing made similar comments. The three parties began exploratory talks on 18 March. On 30 April, they announced they had agreed to renew the coalition.

On 18 May, Dreyer was elected as Minister-President for a third term by the Landtag. She won 55 votes, more than the 51 needed for an absolute majority. The new ministry was sworn in the same day, comprising six SPD, two Green, and two FDP ministers.

See also
 2021 Baden-Württemberg state election

References

2021 elections in Germany
Elections in Rhineland-Palatinate